Mikhail Klavdievich Tikhonravov (July 29, 1900 – March 3, 1974) was a Soviet engineer who was a pioneer of spacecraft design and rocketry.

Mikhail Tikhonravov was born in Vladimir, Russia. He attended the Zhukovsky Air Force Academy from 1922 to 1925, where he was exposed to Konstantin Tsiolkovsky's ideas of spaceflight. After graduation and until 1931 worked in several aircraft industries and was engaged in developing gliders. From 1931 and on, devoted himself to the development of the field of rocketry. In 1932, he joined Group for the Study of Reactive Motion (GIRD), as one of the four brigade leaders.  His brigade built the GIRD-09 rocket, fueled by liquid oxygen and jellied gasoline,  and launched on August 17, 1933.

Tikhonravov became part of the Reactive Scientific Research Institute (RNII) when GIRD and the Gas Dynamics Laboratory (GDL) merged in 1933. From 1938 Tikhonravov researched rocket engines with liquid fuel and developed rockets for the purpose of upper atmosphere layers’ research. In the end of the 1930s, the development of rockets with liquid fuel was stopped and Tikhonravov concentrated on the development of the projectiles of the weapon system Katyusha rocket launcher.

In 1946, he became deputy chief of NII-4 in the Academy of Artillery Science and developed Project VR-190. Tikhonravov in 1948 proposed a type of multistage rocket in which the engines would work in parallel (packet) in order to achieve a greater flight range. His announcement was met with ridicule and skepticism by his scientific colleagues because at that time, it was believed that 1000 km was the absolute limit for rocket range. In NII-4 he led a team of researchers that did important studies on packet rockets, satellite orbital motion, optimal pitch control programs for launching into orbit, reentry trajectories and heat shielding.  This team designed Sputnik-3, Luna-1, Luna-3, Luna-4 and the early Venus and Mars probes. In 1956, Sergey Korolev had Tikhonravov and his team (including Mstislav Keldysh) transferred into his bureau, OKB-1.

After the launch of Sputnik-1 and a satellite with an animal on board, Tikhonravov (along with a number of other scientists) received the Lenin award (1957).

While he was not credited for much of his work Michail Tikhonravov was a lead scientist for the Sputnik 1 rocket and satellite 

The classically educated Tikhonravov has been credited for coining and popularizing the term cosmonaut ("space traveller"), to be distinct from the English astronaut.

Tikhonravov Crater on Mars is named after Mikhail Tikhonravov.

References

Literature 
 "Rockets and people" – B. E. Chertok, M: "mechanical engineering", 1999. 
 "S. P. Korolev. Encyclopedia of life and creativity" - edited by C. A. Lopota, RSC Energia. S. P. Korolev, 2014

External links
Detailed Biography by Anatoly Zak
Sputnik Biographies--Mikhail K. Tikhonravov (1901-1974), NASA

1900 births
1974 deaths
Early spaceflight scientists
People from Vladimir, Russia
Soviet aerospace engineers
Soviet space program personnel
Soviet spaceflight pioneers
Academic staff of Moscow Aviation Institute
Soviet inventors
Burials at Novodevichy Cemetery